Farm Aid is an annual benefit concert held for American farmers.

History
On July 13, 1985, while performing at the Live Aid benefit concert for the 1983–1985 Ethiopian famine, Bob Dylan made comments about family farmers within the United States in danger of losing their farms through mortgage debt, saying to the worldwide audience exceeding one billion people, "I hope that some of the money ... maybe they can just take a little bit of it, maybe ... one or two million, maybe ... and use it, say, to pay the mortgages on some of the farms and, the farmers here, owe to the banks." He is often misquoted, as on Farm Aid's official website, as saying "Wouldn't it be great if we did something for our own farmers right here in America?"

Although his comments were heavily criticised, they inspired fellow musicians Willie Nelson, John Mellencamp and Neil Young to organise the Farm Aid  benefit concert to raise money for and help family farmers in the United States. The first concert was held on September 22, 1985 at the Memorial Stadium in Champaign, Illinois before a crowd of 80,000 people. Performers included Bob Dylan, Billy Joel, B.B. King, Loretta Lynn, Roy Orbison, and Tom Petty, among others, and raised over $9 million for U.S. family farmers.

Willie and the other founders had originally thought that they could have one concert and the problem would be solved, but they admit that the challenges facing family farmers were more complex than anyone realized. As a result, decades after the first show, Farm Aid, under the direction of Carolyn Mugar, is still working to increase awareness of the importance of family farms, and puts on an annual concert of country, blues and rock music with a variety of music artists. The board of directors includes Nelson, Mellencamp, Young, and Dave Matthews, as well as David Anderson, Joel Katz, Lana Nelson, Mark Rothbaum, and Evelyn Shriver.  On 8 April 2021, it was announced that Annie Nelson and Margo Price have joined as board members.  Board member Paul English, who was Willie Nelson's longtime drummer, died in February 2020.

The organization operates an emergency hotline that offers farmers resources and advice about challenges they're experiencing. Early on, Nelson and Mellencamp brought family farmers before Congress to testify about the state of family farming in America. Congress subsequently passed the Agricultural Credit Act of 1987 to help save family farms from foreclosure. Farm Aid also operates a disaster fund to help farmers who lose their belongings and crops through natural disasters, such as the victims of Hurricane Katrina and massive flooding in 2019. The funds raised are used to pay the farmer's expenses and provide food, legal and financial help, and psychological assistance.

The 2005 concert, marking the 20th anniversary of Farm Aid, took place at the Tweeter Center in Tinley Park, Illinois, with events in downtown Chicago as well. The 2007 Concert took place at Randall's Island in New York City (the first Farm Aid in New York) and was recorded in High Definition to be broadcast on HDNet as a 2 Hour Special highlighting many of the performances from the Allman Brothers and Counting Crows to John Mellencamp and Willie Nelson.

The September 2019 lineup includes Willie Nelson, Neil Young, John Mellencamp, Dave Matthews and country music star Luke Combs. The concert at Alpine Valley Music Theatre was Combs' first show at Farm Aid.

In 2022, Farm Aid sought national recognition for the effort to encourage Americans to buy domestic beef.

List of concerts

Board of directors

See also
Farmers' suicides in the United States

References

External links

 
 Official MySpace
 Farm Aid 2006 - Behind The Scenes

Charities based in Massachusetts
Musical advocacy groups
Hunger relief organizations
Rock festivals in the United States
Benefit concerts in the United States
1985 establishments in the United States
Dave Matthews
John Mellencamp
Willie Nelson
Neil Young
Music festivals established in 1985
Country music festivals in the United States